Khanmirza County is in Chaharmahal and Bakhtiari province, Iran. The capital of the county is the city of Aluni. At the 2006 census, the region's population (as Khanmirza District and Armand Rural District of Lordegan County) was 45,640 in 9,407 households. The following census in 2011 counted 45,640 people, in 11,821 households. At the 2016 census, the region's population as parts of Lordegan County was 45,640 in 14,411 households. Those parts were separated from the county in September 2019 to form Khanmirza County.

Administrative divisions

The population history of Khanmirza County's administrative divisions (as parts of Lordegan County) over three consecutive censuses is shown in the following table.

The county has been structured after its establishment as follows:

References

 

Counties of Chaharmahal and Bakhtiari Province